Bajaj Consumer Care Ltd. (formerly known as Bajaj Corp Ltd.) is an Indian consumer goods company with brands in hair care. It is part of the Bajaj Group, founded by Jamnalal Bajaj.  Bajaj Group has interests in varied industries including sugar, consumer goods, power generation and infrastructure development.

Bajaj Consumer Care is the second largest company in the Shishir Bajaj Group of companies. The history of Bajaj Consumer Care dates back to 1930, in 1953, Kamalnayan Bajaj established Bajaj Sevashram to market and sell hair oils and other beauty products. Bajaj Consumer Care Ltd. is the Third-largest player in the producing of hair oils and light hair oil in India. Bajaj Almond Hair Oil, commands a 52% market share in the light hair oil category according to Nielsen Retail Audit Report.

Brands
In August 2013, Bajaj Consumer Care Ltd acquired the skin care brand NOMARKS.

References

External links
 

Indian brands
Cosmetics brands
Companies based in Mumbai
Cosmetics companies of India
Chemical companies established in 1930
Indian companies established in 1930
Companies listed on the Bombay Stock Exchange
Companies listed on the National Stock Exchange of India